"Typical" is the debut single from New Orleans rock group Mutemath. The song was written in 2003 by Paul Meany and Darren King. The digital single was released on April 10, 2007. A physical single was released in the UK only on August 27, 2007. Josh Harris club remixes of the song were also released digitally to several outlets on September 18, 2007. The song is also featured as downloadable content for the Rock Band series of video games. The song was also part of the soundtrack for the 2006 video game ATV Offroad Fury 4. The song was also featured in the 2009 film The Stepfather.

Television and radio
The group has performed the song on both ABC's Jimmy Kimmel Live! and CBS' The Late Late Show with Craig Ferguson, and the video began rotation on MTV Networks in May 2007, beginning with MTVu. An edited form of the song was featured on an advertisement for the Discovery Channel in the spring of 2008. It was also used in a promo for HBO in 2007.

As of late June 2007, the single started receiving major airplay on modern-rock stations and rose quickly up the Mediabase alternative chart, jumping from #115 to #65, and was also the second-most-added song on alternative stations the week of June 13, 2007. The single then jumped to a peak position of #36 the first week of August 2007, remaining there for over 6 weeks and debuted at #39 on Billboard's US Modern Rock Chart the week of August 4, 2007 where it reached a peak position of #33.

Music video
The video for "Typical" premiered on YouTube on March 21, 2007. The concept video was directed by Israel Anthem and features the band performing the song backwards.
Similar to Chris Martin's preparation for the music video for Coldplay's "The Scientist", the band rehearsed and memorized the performance in reverse. The video made it on the New York Post Hot List and registered more than 100,000 views in fewer than four days. In total, the original video has been viewed more than 4 million times. The video reached #7 on Billboard's Hot Video Clip Tracks chart in July 2007. The group garnered further buzz for the single by recreating their video in a live performance for Jimmy Kimmel Live! using the same technique that was used in the original video. The video was nominated for a Grammy Award on December 6, 2007, for "Best Short Form Video".

Track listing
 Original Single Release
 "Typical" (album version) - 4:12

 Promo Remix CD (PRO-CD-102127)
 "Typical" (Josh Harris club mix) - 7:41
 "Typical" (Josh Harris club dub) - 7:31
 "Typical" (Josh Harris remix edit) - 3:48

 UK Single CD (B000UDY8KK)
 "Typical" (album version) - 4:12
 "Progress" - 4:45
 "Typical" (Enhanced CD Video)
 "Typical" (Enhanced CD Live Video) (This video recording is from the Live at the El Rey EP.)

Release history

References

External links
The video for "Typical" on YouTube

2007 singles
Mutemath songs
2006 songs
Warner Records singles
Songs written by Paul Meany